Lay Zangan (also Romanized as Lāy Zangān and Lāy-e Zangān) is a village in Rostaq Rural District, Rostaq District, Darab County, Fars Province, Iran. At the 2006 census, its population was 2,429, in 614 families.

References 

Populated places in Darab County